Sassinoro is a comune (municipality) in the Province of Benevento in the Italian region Campania, located about 70 km northeast of Naples and about 30 km northwest of Benevento.

Sassinoro borders the following municipalities: Morcone, Sepino.

Twin towns
 Ossining, United States

References

Cities and towns in Campania